is a Japanese footballer who plays as a goalkeeper for Avispa Fukuoka.

Career statistics
Updated to end of 2018 season.

References

External links
Profile at Avispa Fukuoka
Profile at Kawasaki Frontale

1987 births
Living people
Association football people from Shizuoka Prefecture
Japanese footballers
J1 League players
J2 League players
Kawasaki Frontale players
Shimizu S-Pulse players
Avispa Fukuoka players
Association football goalkeepers